Bhuj is one of the 182 Legislative Assembly constituencies of Gujarat state in India. It is part of Kachchh district. It is numbered as 3-Bhuj.

List of segments
This assembly seat represents the following segments,

 Bhuj Taluka (Part) Villages – Luna, Bhitara Mota, Udhmo, Gorewali, Khavda, Ratadiya, Dinara, Dhrobana, Kuran, Kunariya (Jam), Juna Juriya, Sadhara, Andhau, Dhoravar, Ludiya, Godpar (Khavda), Khari, Soyla, Mithdi, Bhagadio, Shervo, Hodka, Bhirandiyara, Dedhiya Nana-Mota, Daddhar Nani, Daddhar Moti, Misariyado, Bhojardo, Berdo, Raiyada, Kharod, Dhori, Sumarasar -Shekhvali, Loria, Juriya, Kamaguna, Mod Bhakhari, Motiyar Bhakhari, Nokhaniya, Kunaria Nana-Mota, Kotay, Fulay, Makanpar, Dhonsa, Baukho (Odhejavalo), Baukho (Samavalo), Tankanasar, Vatachhad, Vehro, Natharkui, Vinchhiya, Sumarasar (Jatvali), Virai, Khilna, Ratiya, Kodki, Makhna, Pirvadi, Payarka, Kuvathada, Sadau Rakhal, Fulra Timbo, Anandsar, Kanpar, Fotdi, Kalyanpar, Godsar (Rakhal), Mirjapar, Sukhpar, Mankuva, Nagiyari, Deshalpar, Kurbai, Nabhoi, Vandhay, Samatra, Bharasar, Vandh Sim, Sedata, Naranpar Ravli, Vadasar, Zizu Timbo, Sarli, Dahinsara, Godpar (Sarli), Meghpar, Naranpar Pasayati, Chunadi, Gajod, Medisar Rakhal, Traya Bhakhari, Bhuj (M), Madhapar.

Members of Legislative Assembly

Election results

2022

2017

2012

2007

2002

1998

1995

1990

1985

1980

1975

1972

1967

1962

See also
 List of constituencies of the Gujarat Legislative Assembly
 Kachchh district

References

External links
 

Assembly constituencies of Gujarat
Bhuj
Politics of Kutch district